Your Cassette Pet is the cassette-only debut mini-album by English new wave band Bow Wow Wow, released in November 1980 on EMI Records. It included a cover of the 1940 Johnny Mercer/Rube Bloom pop hit "Fools Rush In".

Release
Your Cassette Pet contained only eight tracks, and was not available on vinyl. Therefore, it was eligible only for the UK Singles Chart, where it peaked at No. 58, and not the UK Albums Chart.

In 1982, to capitalize on the success of the "I Want Candy" music video on MTV, and the I Want Candy album, EMI released the LP record Original Recordings, containing all eight original tracks from Your Cassette Pet, plus eight additional tracks. Among them were their first single, "C·30 C·60 C·90 Go" (which holds the distinction of being the world's first-ever cassette single), their second single, "W.O.R.K (N.O. Nah No! No! My Daddy Don't)", and their respective B-sides. An abridged version with 12 tracks was released for American audiences.

In 1993, EMI released Girl Bites Dog - Your Compact Disc Pet on CD. Girl Bites Dog contained all 16 tracks from Original Recordings, an extended version of "W.O.R.K (N.O. Nah No! No! My Daddy Don't)", and a cover of Roy Orbison's "Cast Iron Arm".

On 25 May 2018, Cherry Red Records released the three-disc set Your Box Set Pet (The Complete Recordings 1980–1984). The third disc, subtitled Singles, B-Sides & Remixes contains Your Cassette Pet in its entirety (tracks 3–10) except for a short piece of instrumental music in between "Sexy Eiffel Towers" and "Giant Sized Baby Thing", which is missing.

Track listing

Personnel
Bow Wow Wow
Annabella Lwin - vocals
Matthew Ashman - guitar
Leigh Gorman - bass
Dave Barbarossa - drums
Technical
Pat Stapley - engineer

References

External links
Annabella Lwin's official website

1980 debut EPs
Bow Wow Wow albums
EMI Records EPs